"Love and Marriage" is a song popularized by Frank Sinatra.

Love and Marriage may also refer to:

Film and television
Love and Marriage (film), a 1964 Italian film
Love and Marriage (1959 TV series), an American sitcom on NBC starring William Demarest
Love and Marriage (1984 TV series), a Yorkshire Television anthology series
Love and Marriage (1996 TV series), an American sitcom on Fox starring Anthony Denison
Love and Marriage (2013 TV series), a British comedy-drama on ITV
"Love and Marriage" (2point4 Children), a television episode
""Love and Marriage" (M*A*S*H)", a television episode

Other uses
"Love (and Marriage)", the theme of the 2013 Pride in London festival

See also
Love Marriage (disambiguation)